Giannis Tatsis (born 15 August 1972) is a Greek professional football manager and former player.

Managerial statistics 
As of 6 February 2023.

References

1972 births
Living people
Footballers from Ioannina
Greek footballers
PAS Giannina F.C. players
Apollon Smyrnis F.C. players
Paniliakos F.C. players
A.P.O. Akratitos Ano Liosia players
Kallithea F.C. players
Kavala F.C. players
Super League Greece players
Association football midfielders
Greek football managers
Platanias F.C. managers
Athlitiki Enosi Larissa F.C. managers
Kallithea F.C. managers
Super League Greece managers